The Strike ("Siren") is a 1947 Czechoslovak film about striking miners directed by Karel Steklý. It is based on the novel of the same title by Marie Majerová.

It was awarded Grand International Prize (later known as Golden Lion) in Venice Film Festival in 1947.

Cast
 Ladislav Boháč as Hudec
 Marie Vášová as Hudcová
 Oleg Reif as Rudolf
 Nadězda Mauerová as Růžena
 Pavla Suchá as Emča
 Josef Bek as Karel Hampl
 Bedřich Karen as Bacher
 Josef Dekoj as Černý
 Věra Kalendová as Černá
 Lída Matoušková as Kazdová

References

External links
 

1947 films
Czechoslovak black-and-white films
1947 drama films
Films directed by Karel Steklý
Golden Lion winners
Czechoslovak drama films
1940s Czech-language films
1940s Czech films